Alaena maculata is a butterfly in the family Lycaenidae. It is found in the Democratic Republic of the Congo (from the south-eastern part of the country to Sankuru and Lualaba).

References

Butterflies described in 1933
Alaena
Endemic fauna of the Democratic Republic of the Congo
Butterflies of Africa